Woodstock High School is a public high school located in Woodstock, Illinois, a part of Woodstock Community Unit School District 200. Established in 1921, it is located 25 minutes south of Wisconsin and 51 miles northwest of Chicago. It has an enrollment of 1,198 students.

Racial/ethnic background 
The student body is 70.1% White, 24.7% Hispanic, 2.4% Black, 1.4% Asian/Pacific Islander, 0.3% Native American, and 1.1% multi-racial.

Financial/sociological status 
The student body is 26.0% low income, and 2.9% of limited English proficiency. The school has a 1.7% dropout rate.

Advanced placement
Woodstock High School offers the following Advanced Placement courses: 
A.P. Calculus AB
A.P. Calculus BC
A.P. Statistics
A.P. Biology
A.P. Environmental Science
A.P. Chemistry
A.P. Physics
A.P. English Literature
A.P. English Composition
A.P. United States History
A.P. European History (2008–2009)
A.P. Art Studies
A.P. French
A.P. German
A.P. Spanish
A.P. Art History
A.P. Music Theory (2008–2009)
A.P. Psychology

Athletics

Football
Playoff Qualifier: 1976-400A 1980-400A 1985-4A 1996-5A 1998-5A 2001-6A 2002-400A 2003-7A 2004-7A 2005-7A 2007-7A 2008-7A
Quarterfinals: 1990-4A, 1991-4A, 1996-5A, 2000-5A
Semifinals: 1977-4A, 1989-4A, 2009-5A
State Champions: 1983-4A, 1997-5A

Baseball
State Final Qualifier: 1992 AA
District: 1949, 1953
Regional: 1984AA, 1990AA, 1992AA, 2014 3A
Sectional: 1992AA
3rd in State: 1992AA

Volleyball
State Final Qualifier: 1979AA, 1984AA
District: 1975, 1977AA, 1978AA, 1979AA
Regional: 1984AA, 1986AA, 1987AA, 1988AA, 1998AA, 20064A
Sectional: 1979AA, 1984AA
Super-Sectional: 1979AA, 1984AA

Soccer
Regional Champions 2018
Conference Champions 2019 (10-0, 43 goals scored, 0 conceded)

Other recognitions
 Music Department - second in the state in 2007 and 2008, and third in the state in 2009; second in state 2012; choir first in state; band 8th
Envirothon - second in state 2005, State Championship 2009

Organizations 
National Honors Society
Foreign language honor societies: French, Spanish, German
Math Team
Choir - Standing Room Only, Madrigals, Varsity, Men's, Women's, Premium Blend, Treble Concert
Band - Jazz Lab, Jazz Ensemble, Jazz Combo, Varsity, Symphonic
Scholastic Bowl
Envirothon
Future Business Leaders of America
Art and Cartoon Club
Chess Club
Latinos Unidos Con Honor Americano (LUCHA)
Spanish Club
Tri-M Music Honors Society
German club

Notable alumni
 Jeff Curran, retired professional mixed martial artist

Gigi Goode, drag artist, runner up on Season 12 of RuPaul’s Drag Race

See also
Woodstock North High School
Woodstock, Illinois
McHenry County, Illinois
Marian Central Catholic High School
Schools in Illinois

References

External links
Woodstock High School website
McHenry County sports - Woodstock High School

Public high schools in Illinois
Woodstock, Illinois
Schools in McHenry County, Illinois